Sam Crow may refer to:

 Sam A. Crow (1926–2022), United States federal judge
 Sam Crow (baseball), pre-Negro leagues infielder

See also
 SAMCRO, Sons of Anarchy Motorcycle Club, Redwood Original